Overall performance of Guinea-Bissau in the Lusophone Games.

Medal table by sports

Participation by year 
 2006
 2009

Lusophony Games
Nations at the Lusofonia Games